The Third Battle of the Dardanelles in the Fifth Ottoman-Venetian War took place on 26  and 27 June 1656 inside the Dardanelles Strait. The battle was a clear victory for Venice and the Knights Hospitaller over the Ottoman Empire, although their commander, Lorenzo Marcello, was killed on the first day.

Background 
Since 1645, Venice and the Ottoman Empire had been at war over the possession of the island of Crete. Ottoman forces had captured most of the island in the early years of the war, but were unable to seize its capital, the heavily fortified city of Candia (modern Heraklion). The Venetians had endeavoured to cut off supplies and reinforcements to the Ottoman army, and attempted several times to blockade the Straits of the Dardanelles, through which the Ottoman fleet had to sail to reach the Aegean Sea from its base around Constantinople.

Preface 
Marcello reached the island of Imbros, outside the Dardanelles Strait, on 23 May 1656 with 13 sailing ships, 6 galleasses and 24 galleys as well as some more vessels under Pietro Bembo. On 11 June, 7 Maltese galleys under Gregorio Carafa arrived, making a total of 29 sailing ships, 7 galleasses and 31 galleys.

On 23 June the Ottomans, under Kenan or Chinam Pasha, a Russian convert, appeared in the Strait with 28 sailing ships, 9 galleasses and 61 galleys. On 24 June Turkish land batteries on either side of the Straits tried to drive the Venetians off but failed.

Battle 
In the morning of 26 June the wind was from the north, and the Ottomans made good progress, the Venetian galleys being unable to assist their sailing ships. Then the wind backed, turning to the SE, trapping the Ottomans against the Asian side of the Strait just below the Narrows, and a mêlée ensued.  Kenan Pasha got back past the Narrows with 14 galleys but the rest were either captured, sunk or burnt. Sultan/San Marco was the most advanced Venetian ship and did the most to prevent the Ottoman retreat, but she ran aground under the Ottoman guns and was abandoned.

During the course of the battle, the Venetian Captain General Marcello was killed by a direct cannon hit, but his death kept a secret from all but his second, the provedditore of the fleet Barbaro Badoer.

Some small-scale fighting happened the next day, and at the end of it, the Ottoman fleet had lost 4 large sailing ships, 2 pinks, 5 galleasses and 13 galleys captured, and 22 sailing ships, 4 galleasses and 34 galleys sunk or burnt. Only 2 Ottoman sailing ships and 14 galleys escaped. Of the captured ships, Malta received 2 galleasses, 8 galleys and 1 "super galley" (or galleass?). The Venetians lost 3 sailing ships burnt and their casualties were 207 killed, 260 wounded and 94 missing. Maltese casualties were 40 killed and 100 or more wounded. Some 5,000 Christian slaves employed in the Ottoman fleet were freed.

Aftermath 
It was the heaviest naval defeat the Ottomans had suffered since the Battle of Lepanto, and enabled the Venetians to occupy the strategically important islands of Tenedos and Lemnos, thus establishing a tight blockade of the Straits. As a result, the resupply of Crete was effectively cut off, and Constantinople itself suffered a shortage of food during the winter. In a three-day battle in July 1657, however, the blockade would be broken again.

Ships involved

Christian fleet

Venice (Lorenzo Marcello, with Pietro Bembo) 
Fregata Contarini
Tomaso Francesco
Principessa grande
Tre Re
Croce d'Oro
Principessa piccola
Gallo d'Oro
Sacrificio d'Abram
Aquila Coronata (Kronede Arend)
Profeta Samuel
Arma di Nassau - Burnt
Lionessa
Arma di Lech
Leon Negro
Madonna del Carmine
Santa Caterina
Profeta Elia
San Bartolamio
Fama Volante
Ercole
Rosa Bianca
Speranza (or San Nicola)
Principe di Colognia
San Pietro (hired Dutch) - Burnt
Sultana/San Marco (ex-Ottoman) - Aground, abandoned and burnt
Santa Margarita
Paramor
?
?
7 galleasses
24 galleys

Malta (Gregorio Carafa) 
7 galleys

Ottoman Empire (Kenan Pasha) 
4 large sailing ships - Captured
24 other sailing ships - 22 sunk/burnt
2 pinks - Captured
9 galleasses - 5 captured, 4 sunk/burnt
61 galleys - 13 captured, 34 sunk/burnt

References

Sources 

 
 
 

the Dardanelles 1656
Dardanelles 1656
Dardanelles 1656
History of the Dardanelles